Gerbo is a woreda in Somali Region, Ethiopia, named after its major town, Gerbo. Part of the Nogob Zone (formerly the Fiq Zone), Gerbo is bounded on the northwest by Segeg, on the north by the Degehabur Zone, on the East by the Korahe Zone, on the south by the Gode Zone, and on the West by Dihun.

In January 2007, the Ogaden National Liberation Front struck in this woreda, killing five local officials who refused to hand over heavy weapons to the rebels.

Demographics 
Based on the 2007 Census conducted by the Central Statistical Agency of Ethiopia, this woreda has a total population of 45,413, of whom 25,507 are men and 19,906 women. While 6,742 or 14.85% are urban inhabitants, a further 24,312 or 53.53% are pastoralists. 99.43% of the population said they were Muslim The largest inhabitants are Ogaden clan sub-clan of Mohamed Subeer, Ugaas Kooshin

The 1997 national census reported a total population for this woreda of 27,822, of whom 15,494 were men and 12,328 were women; 7,925 or 28.48% of its population were urban dwellers. (This total also includes an estimate for the inhabitants of 3 rural kebeles, which were not counted; they were estimated to have 1,294 inhabitants, of whom 688 were men and 606 women.) The largest ethnic group reported in Gerbo was the Somali (95.31%).

Notes 

Districts of Somali Region